Mount Gardiner is a  mountain summit located in the Cayoosh Range of the Lillooet Ranges, in southwestern British Columbia, Canada. The mountain was named for William and Henry Gardiner, early settlers who farmed in Pemberton Meadows. The name was officially adopted on June 11, 1979, by the Geographical Names Board of Canada. Precipitation runoff from the peak drains into tributaries of the Fraser River.

Climate
Based on the Köppen climate classification, Mount Gardiner is located in a subarctic climate zone of western North America. Most weather fronts originate in the Pacific Ocean, and travel east toward the Coast Mountains where they are forced upward by the range (Orographic lift), causing them to drop their moisture in the form of rain or snowfall. As a result, the Coast Mountains experience high precipitation, especially during the winter months in the form of snowfall. Temperatures can drop below −20 °C with wind chill factors below −30 °C. The months July through September offer the most favorable weather for climbing Mount Gardiner.

Climbing Routes
Established climbing routes on Mount Gardiner:

 South Ridge   
 Northeast Ridge -

See also

 Geography of British Columbia
 Geology of British Columbia

References

External links
 Weather: Mount Gardiner

Two-thousanders of British Columbia
Pacific Ranges
Lillooet Land District